The Michigan-Ontario Collegiate Conference was an intercollegiate athletic conference that existed from 1930 to 1941. The league had members in the states of Michigan and Ohio as well as the Canadian province of Ontario.

Football Champions

1930 – Adrian (MI)
1931 – Adrian (MI)
1932 – Adrian (MI) and Saint Mary's (MI)
1933 – Adrian (MI) and Lawrence Tech

1934 – Adrian (MI)
1935 – Adrian (MI)
1936 – Adrian (MI)
1937 – Ferris and Lawrence Tech

1938 – Lawrence Tech
1939 – DeSales
1940 – Assumption (ON), DeSales, and Lawrence Tech
1941 – Lawrence Tech

See also
List of defunct college football conferences

References

Defunct college sports conferences in the United States
College sports in Michigan
College sports in Ohio
1903 establishments
1941 disestablishments
Sport in Ontario